A chess opening or simply an opening is the initial stage of a chess game. It usually consists of established theory; the other phases are the middlegame and the endgame. Many opening sequences have standard names such as the "Sicilian Defense". The Oxford Companion to Chess lists 1,327 named openings and variants, and there are many others with varying degrees of common usage.

Opening moves that are considered standard are referred to as "book moves", or simply "book". When a game begins to deviate from known opening theory, the players are said to be "out of book". In some openings, "book" lines have been worked out for over 30 moves, as in the classical King's Indian Defense and in the Najdorf variation of the Sicilian Defense.

Professional chess players spend years studying openings, and continue doing so throughout their careers, as opening theory continues to evolve. Players at the club level also study openings but the importance of the opening phase is smaller there since games are rarely decided in the opening. The study of openings can become unbalanced if it is to the exclusion of tactical training and middlegame and endgame strategy.

When kept secret until used in a competitive game, it is often known as a prepared variation, a powerful weapon in top-class competition.

Aims of the opening

Common aims in opening play
Whether they are trying to gain the upper hand as White, or to equalize as Black or to create dynamic imbalances, players generally devote a lot of attention in the opening stages to the following strategies:
 Development: One of the main aims of the opening is to mobilize the pieces on useful squares where they will have impact on the game. To this end, knights are usually developed to f3, c3, f6, and c6 (or sometimes e2, d2, e7, or d7), and both players' king and queen pawns are moved so the bishops can be developed (alternatively, the bishops may be fianchettoed with a maneuver such as g3 and Bg2). Rapid mobilization is the key. The queen, and to a lesser extent the rooks, are not usually played to a central position until later in the game, when many minor pieces and pawns are no longer present.
 Control of the center: At the start of the game, it is not clear on which part of the board the pieces will be needed. However, control of the central squares allows pieces to be moved to any part of the board relatively easily, and can also have a cramping effect on the opponent. The classical view is that central control is best effected by placing pawns there, ideally establishing pawns on d4 and e4 (or d5 and e5 for Black). However, the hypermodern school showed that it was not always necessary or even desirable to occupy the center in this way, and that too broad a pawn front could be attacked and destroyed, leaving its architect vulnerable; an impressive-looking pawn center is worth little unless it can be maintained. The hypermoderns instead advocated controlling the center from a distance with pieces, breaking down one's opponent's center, and only taking over the center oneself later in the game. This leads to openings such as Alekhine's Defense – in a line like 1.e4 Nf6 2.e5 Nd5 3.d4 d6 4.c4 Nb6 5.f4 (the Four Pawns Attack) White has a formidable pawn center for the moment, but Black hopes to undermine it later in the game, leaving White's position exposed.
 King safety: The king is somewhat exposed in the middle of the board. Measures must be taken to reduce his vulnerability. It is therefore common for both players either to castle in the opening (simultaneously developing one of the rooks) or to otherwise bring the king to the side of the board via artificial castling.
 Prevention of pawn weakness: Most openings strive to avoid the creation of pawn weaknesses such as isolated, doubled and backward pawns, pawn islands, etc. Some openings sacrifice endgame considerations for a quick attack on the opponent's position. Some unbalanced openings for Black, in particular, make use of this idea, such as the Dutch and the Sicilian. Other openings, such as the Alekhine and the Benoni, invite the opponent to overextend and form pawn weaknesses. Specific openings accept pawn weaknesses in exchange for compensation in the form of dynamic play. (See Pawn structure.)
 Piece coordination: As the players mobilize their pieces, they both seek to ensure that they are working harmoniously towards the control of key squares.
 Create positions in which the player is more comfortable than the opponent: Transposition is one common way of doing this.

Apart from these ideas, other strategies used in the middlegame may also be carried out in the opening. These include preparing pawn breaks to create counterplay, creating weaknesses in the opponent's pawn structure, seizing control of key squares, making favorable exchanges of minor pieces (e.g. gaining the bishop pair), or gaining a space advantage, whether in the center or on the flanks.

Top-level objectives
At higher levels of competition, for many years the main objectives of opening play were to obtain a better position when playing as White and to equalize when playing as Black. The idea behind this is that playing first gives White a slight initial advantage; for example, White will be the first to attack if the game opens symmetrically (Black mirrors White's moves).

Since about the 1950s another objective has gradually become more dominant. According to IM Jeremy Silman, the purpose of the opening is to create dynamic imbalances between the two sides, which will determine the character of the middlegame and the strategic plans chosen by both sides. For example, in the main line of the Winawer Variation of the French Defense (1.e4 e6 2.d4 d5 3.Nc3 Bb4 4.e5 c5 5.a3 Bxc3+ 6.bxc3), White will try to use their  and  advantage to mount an attack on Black's , while Black will seek simplifying exchanges (in particular, trading off one of White's bishops to blunt this advantage) and counterattack against the weakened pawns on White's ; both players accept different combinations of advantages and disadvantages. This idea was a doctrine of the Soviet school of chess.

A third objective, which is complementary to the previous ones and has been common since the 19th century, is to lure the opponent into positions with which the player is more familiar and comfortable than the opponent. This is usually done by transpositions, in which a game that apparently starts with one opening can reach a position that is normally produced by a different opening.

Opening repertoires

Most players realize after a while that they play certain types of positions better than others, and that the amount of theory they can learn is limited. Therefore, most players specialize in certain openings where they know the theory and that lead to positions they favor. The set of openings a player has specialized in is called an opening repertoire. The main elements a player needs to consider in a repertoire are:
 As White, whether to open with 1.e4, 1.d4, 1.c4, or 1.Nf3
 As Black, a defense against any of these openings

A very narrow repertoire allows for deeper specialization but also makes a player less flexible to vary against different opponents. In addition, opponents may find it easier to prepare against a player with a narrow repertoire.

The main openings in a repertoire are usually reasonably sound; that is, they should lead to playable positions even against optimal counterplay. Unsound gambits are sometimes used as surprise weapons, but are unreliable for a stable repertoire. Repertoires often change as a player develops, and a player's advancement may be stifled if the opening repertoire does not evolve. Some openings that are effective against amateur players are less effective at the master level. For example, Black obtains active play in return for a pawn in the Benko Gambit; amateur players may have trouble defending against Black's activity, while masters are more skilled at defending and making use of the extra pawn. Some openings played between grandmasters are so complex and theoretical that amateur players will have trouble understanding them. An example is the Perenyi Attack of the Sicilian Defense (see diagram), which yields an immensely complicated and tactical position that even strong players have difficulty handling, and that is beyond the comprehension of most amateurs.

Opening nomenclature
Major changes in the rules of chess in the late fifteenth century increased the speed of the game, consequently emphasizing the importance of opening study. Thus, early chess books, such as the 1497 text of Luis Ramirez de Lucena, present opening analysis, as do Pedro Damiano (1512) and Ruy López de Segura (1561). Ruy López's disagreement with Damiano regarding the merits of 2...Nc6 led to 3.Bb5 (after 1.e4 e5 2.Nf3 Nc6) being named for him as the Ruy Lopez or Spanish Opening. Opening theory was studied more scientifically from the 1840s on, and many opening variations were discovered and named in this period and later.

Opening nomenclature developed haphazardly, and most names are historical accidents not based on systematic principles. In the early 1930s, the nascent FIDE embarked on a project to standardize opening nomenclature, culminating in the publication of a short booklet in 1933, but this had little impact.

The oldest openings tend to be named for geographic places and people. Many openings are named after nationalities of players who advocated them, for example Indian, English, Spanish, French, Dutch, Scotch, Russian, Italian, Scandinavian and Sicilian, or places where important games featuring the opening were played such as Vienna, Berlin, and Wilkes-Barre. The Catalan System is named after the Catalonia region.

Chess players' names are the most common sources of opening names.
The name given to an opening is not always that of the first player to adopt it; often an opening is named for the player who was the first to popularize it or to publish analysis of it. Eponymic openings include the Ruy Lopez, Alekhine's Defense, Morphy Defense, and the Réti Opening. Some opening names honor two people, such as the Caro–Kann.

A few opening names are purely descriptive, such as Giuoco Piano, Two Knights Defense and Four Knights Game.

Some openings have been given fanciful names, often names of animals. This practice became more common in the 20th century. By then, most of the more common and traditional sequences of opening moves had already been named, so these tend to be unusual or recently developed openings like the Orangutan, Hippopotamus, Elephant, and Hedgehog. A few are given humorous names, such as the Monkey's Bum and the Toilet Variation.

Opening names usually include one of the terms "opening", "variation", "defense", "gambit" etc, however the terminology is inconsistent and imprecise, and is not a useful basis for classification. Broadly, these terms are used as follows:

 Game : Used for some of the oldest named openings, such as the Scotch Game, Vienna Game, and Four Knights Game. In the 19th century it was used for other common openings such as the Sicilian Defense ("Sicilian Game") and French Defense ("French Game").
 Opening : This usually refers to an opening played by White, such as the English Opening or Bird's Opening.
 Variation : Used to describe a branch of another named opening, for example the Najdorf Variation, a line of the Sicilian Defense.
 Defense : Refers to an opening chosen by Black, such as Two Knights Defense or Caro-Kann Defense. Some openings described as "defenses", such as the King's Indian Defense and Sicilian Defense, can in fact be quite aggressive.
 Gambit : An opening that involves the sacrifice of material, usually one or more pawns. Most openings described as "Gambits" are played by White (e.g., King's Gambit), but a few are played by Black (e.g., Latvian Gambit). The terms "Accepted" or "Declined" may be appended to the name, depending on whether the opponent takes the offered material, as in the Queen's Gambit Accepted and Queen's Gambit Declined. In the case of the Queen's Gambit, the sacrifice of material is only temporary as there is no good way for Black to keep the pawn . 
 Countergambit : A gambit played by Black, often in response to another gambit. Examples of this include the Albin Countergambit in response to the Queen's Gambit, the Falkbeer Countergambit in response to the King's Gambit, and the Greco Counter Gambit (the former name of the Latvian Gambit) in response to the King's Knight Opening.
 System : A method of development that can be used against many different setups by the opponent. Examples include London System, Colle System, Réti System, Barcza System, and Hedgehog System.
 Attack : Usually used to describe an aggressive or provocative variation such as the Albin–Chatard Attack (or Chatard–Alekhine Attack), the Fried Liver Attack in the Two Knights Defense, and the Grob Attack. The King's Indian Attack is an exception, describing a King's Indian Defense with colors reversed.
 Reversed, Inverted : A Black opening played by White, or more rarely a White opening played by Black. Examples include the Sicilian Reversed (from the English Opening) and the Inverted Hungarian. The Reti, King's Indian Attack, Sicilian Reversed (from the English), and other "Black played by White with an extra tempo" often start with 1.Nf3 or 1.c4.
 Anti-. Prefix for openings designed to avoid a specific line, for example the Anti-Marshall (against the Marshall (Counter) Attack in the Ruy Lopez) and the Anti-Meran Gambit (against the Meran Variation of the Semi-Slav Defense).

Classification of chess openings

Chess openings are primarily categorized by move sequences. In the initial position, White has twenty legal moves. Of these, 1.e4, 1.d4, 1.Nf3, and 1.c4 are by far the most popular as these moves do the most to promote rapid development and control of the center. A few other opening moves are considered reasonable but less consistent with opening principles than the four most popular moves. The Dunst Opening, 1.Nc3, develops a knight to a good square, but is somewhat inflexible because it blocks White's c-pawn; also, after 1...d5 the knight is liable to be driven to an inferior square by ...d4. (Note that after 1.Nf3 the analogous 1...e5? loses a pawn.) Bird's Opening, 1.f4, addresses center control but not development and weakens the king position slightly. The Sokolsky Opening 1.b4 and the King's and Queen's fianchettos: Larsen's Opening 1.b3 and 1.g3 aid development a bit, but they only address center control peripherally and are slower than the more popular openings. The eleven remaining possibilities are rarely played at the top levels of chess. Of these, the best are merely slow such as 1.c3, 1.d3, and 1.e3. Worse possibilities either ignore the center and development such as 1.a3, weaken White's position (for instance, 1.f3 and 1.g4), or place the knights on poor squares (1.Na3 and 1.Nh3).

Black has twenty complementary responses to White's opening move.  Many of these are mirror images of the most popular first moves for White, but with one less tempo. Defenses beginning with 1...c6 and 1...e6, often followed by the center thrust 2...d5, are also popular. Defenses with an early ...d6 coupled with a kingside fianchetto are also commonly played.

The most important scheme of classifying chess openings for serious players is by ECO code, a series of 500 opening codes assigned by the Encyclopaedia of Chess Openings. Although these codes are invaluable for the serious study of the chess opening, they are not very practical for a broad survey of the chess opening as the codes obscure common structural features between related openings.

A simple descriptive categorization of the chess opening is King's Pawn Openings, Queen's Pawn Openings, and Others. Since these categories are still individually very large, it is common to divide each of them further. One reasonable way to group the openings is:
 Double King Pawn, Symmetric or Open Games (1.e4 e5)
 Single King Pawn or Semi-Open Games (1.e4 other)
 Double Queen Pawn or Closed Games (1.d4 d5)
 Single Queen Pawn or Semi-Closed Games (1.d4 other)
 Flank openings (including 1.c4, 1.Nf3, 1.f4, and others)
 Unusual first moves for White
The Indian systems (1.d4 Nf6) are the most important of the Semi-Closed Games, and warrant separate treatment.

Open games: 1.e4 e5

White starts by playing 1.e4 (moving their king pawn two spaces). This is the most popular opening move and it has many strengths—it immediately works on controlling the center, and it frees two pieces (the queen and a bishop). The oldest openings in chess follow 1.e4. Bobby Fischer rated 1.e4 as "Best by test." On the downside, 1.e4 places a pawn on an undefended square and weakens d4 and f4. If Black mirrors White's move and replies with 1...e5, the result is an open game.

The most popular second move for White is 2.Nf3 attacking Black's king pawn, preparing for a kingside castle, and anticipating the advance of the queen pawn to d4. Black's most common reply is 2...Nc6, which usually leads to the Ruy Lopez (3.Bb5), Scotch Game (3.d4), or Italian Game (3.Bc4). If Black instead maintains symmetry and counterattacks White's center with 2...Nf6 then the Petrov's Defense results. The Philidor Defense (2...d6) is not popular in modern chess because it allows White an easy space advantage while Black's position remains cramped and passive, although solid. Other responses to 2.Nf3 are not seen in master play.

The most popular alternatives to 2.Nf3 are the Vienna Game (2.Nc3), the Bishop's Opening (2.Bc4), and the King's Gambit (2.f4). These openings have some similarities with each other, in particular the Bishop's Opening frequently transposes to variations of the Vienna Game. The King's Gambit was extremely popular in the 19th century. White sacrifices a pawn for quick development and to pull a black pawn out of the center. The Vienna Game also frequently features attacks on the Black center by means of a f2–f4 pawn advance.

In the Center Game (2.d4) White immediately opens the center but if the pawn is to be recovered after 2...exd4, White must contend with a slightly premature queen development after 3.Qxd4. An alternative is to sacrifice one or two pawns, for example in the Danish Gambit.

Many other variations after 1.e4 e5 have been studied; see Open Game for details.
 1.e4 e5 Double King's Pawn Opening or Open Game
 1.e4 e5 2.Nf3 Nc6 3.Bb5 Ruy Lopez
 1.e4 e5 2.Nf3 Nc6 3.d4 Scotch Game
 1.e4 e5 2.Nf3 Nc6 3.Bc4 Italian Game
 1.e4 e5 2.Nf3 Nc6 3.Nc3 Nf6 Four Knights Game
 1.e4 e5 2.Nf3 Nf6 Petrov's Defense
 1.e4 e5 2.Nf3 d6 Philidor Defense
 1.e4 e5 2.Nc3 Vienna Game
 1.e4 e5 2.Bc4 Bishop's Opening
 1.e4 e5 2.f4 King's Gambit
 1.e4 e5 2.d4 exd4 3.Qxd4 Center Game
 1.e4 e5 2.d4 exd4 3.c3 Danish Gambit

Semi-open games: 1.e4, Black plays other than 1...e5

In the semi-open games White plays 1.e4 and Black breaks symmetry immediately by replying with a move other than 1...e5. The most popular Black defense to 1.e4 is the Sicilian (1...c5), but the French (1...e6, normally followed by 2.d4 d5) and the Caro–Kann (1...c6, normally followed by 2.d4 d5) are also very popular. The Pirc and the Modern are closely related openings that are also often seen, while the Alekhine and the Scandinavian have made occasional appearances in World Chess Championship games.

The Sicilian and French Defenses lead to unbalanced positions that can offer exciting play with both sides having chances to win. The Caro–Kann Defense is solid as Black intends to use their c-pawn to support their center (1.e4 c6 2.d4 d5). Alekhine's, the Pirc and the Modern are hypermodern openings in which Black tempts White to build a large center with the goal of attacking it with pieces.

Other semi-open games have been studied but are less common; see Semi-Open Game for details.
 1.e4 c5 Sicilian Defense
 1.e4 e6 French Defense
 1.e4 c6 Caro–Kann Defense
 1.e4 d5 Scandinavian Defense (also known as the Center Counter defense)
 1.e4 d6 2.d4 Nf6 3.Nc3 g6 Pirc Defense
 1.e4 Nf6 Alekhine's Defense
 1.e4 g6 Modern Defense

Closed games: 1.d4 d5

The openings classified as closed games begin 1.d4 d5. The move 1.d4 offers the same benefits to development and center control as does 1.e4, but unlike with King Pawn openings where the e4-pawn is undefended after the first move, the d4-pawn is protected by White's queen. This slight difference has a tremendous effect on the opening. For instance, whereas the King's Gambit is rarely played today at the highest levels of chess, the Queen's Gambit remains a popular weapon at all levels of play. Also, compared with the King Pawn openings, transpositions among variations are more common and critical in the closed games.

The most important closed openings are in the Queen's Gambit family (White plays 2.c4). The Queen's Gambit is somewhat misnamed, since White can always regain the offered pawn if desired. In the Queen's Gambit Accepted, Black plays ...dxc4, giving up the center for free development and the chance to try to give White an isolated queen pawn with a subsequent ...c5 and ...cxd4. White will get active pieces and possibilities for the attack. Black has two popular ways to decline the pawn, the Slav (2...c6) and the Queen's Gambit Declined (2...e6). Both of these moves lead to an immense forest of variations that can require a great deal of opening study to play well. Among the many possibilities in the Queen's Gambit Declined are the Orthodox Defense, Lasker's Defense, the Cambridge Springs Defense, the Tartakower Variation, and the Tarrasch and Semi-Tarrasch Defenses. Black replies to the Queen's Gambit other than 2...dxc4, 2...c6, and 2...e6 are uncommon.

The Colle System and Stonewall Attack are classified as Queen's Pawn Games because White plays d4 but not c4. They are also examples of Systems, rather than specific opening variations. White develops aiming for a particular formation without great concern over how Black chooses to defend. Both systems are popular with club players because they are easy to learn, but are rarely used by professionals because a well-prepared opponent playing Black can equalize fairly easily. The Stonewall is characterized by the White pawn formation on c3, d4, e3, and f4, and can be achieved by several move orders and against many different Black setups. The diagram positions and the move sequences given below are typical.

Other closed openings have been studied but are less common; see Closed Game for details.
 1.d4 d5 Double Queen's Pawn Opening or Closed Game
 1.d4 d5 2.c4 Queen's Gambit
 1.d4 d5 2.c4 dxc4 Queen's Gambit Accepted (QGA)
 1.d4 d5 2.c4 e6 Queen's Gambit Declined (QGD)
 1.d4 d5 2.c4 c6 Slav Defense
 1.d4 d5 2.e3 Nf6 3.Bd3 c5 4.c3 Nc6 5.f4 (a typical move sequence) Stonewall Attack
 1.d4 d5 2.Nf3 Nf6 3.e3 Colle System

Indian defenses: 1.d4 Nf6

The Indian systems are asymmetrical defenses to 1.d4 that employ hypermodern chess strategy. Fianchettos are common in many of these openings. As with the closed games, transpositions are important and many of the Indian defenses can be reached by several different move orders. Although Indian defenses were championed in the 1920s by players in the hypermodern school, they were not fully accepted until Soviet players showed in the late 1940s that these systems are sound for Black. Since then, Indian defenses have been the most popular Black replies to 1.d4 because they offer an unbalanced game with chances for both sides. The usual White second move is 2.c4, grabbing a larger share of the center and allowing the move Nc3, to prepare for moving the e-pawn to e4 without blocking the c-pawn. Black's most popular replies are:
 2...e6, freeing the king's bishop and leading into the Nimzo-Indian Defense, Queen's Indian Defense, Bogo–Indian Defense, Modern Benoni, or regular lines of the Queen's Gambit Declined,
 2...g6, preparing a fianchetto of the king's bishop and entering the King's Indian Defense or Grünfeld Defense, and
 2...c5 3.d5 e6, the Modern Benoni, with an immediate counterpunch in the center.

Advocated by Nimzowitsch as early as 1913, the Nimzo-Indian Defense was the first of the Indian systems to gain full acceptance. It remains one of the most popular and well-respected defenses to 1.d4 and White often adopts move orders designed to avoid it. Black attacks the center with pieces and is prepared to trade a bishop for a knight to weaken White's queenside with doubled pawns.

The King's Indian Defense is aggressive, somewhat risky, and generally indicates that Black will not be satisfied with a draw. Although it was played occasionally as early as the late 19th century, the King's Indian was considered inferior until the 1940s, when it was taken up by Bronstein, Boleslavsky, and Reshevsky. Despite being Fischer's favored defense to 1.d4, its popularity faded in the mid-1970s. Kasparov's successes with the defense restored the King's Indian to prominence in the 1980s.

Ernst Grünfeld debuted the Grünfeld Defense in 1922. Distinguished by the move 3...d5, Grünfeld intended it as an improvement to the King's Indian which was not considered entirely satisfactory at that time. The Grünfeld has been adopted by World Champions Smyslov, Fischer, and Kasparov.

The Queen's Indian Defense is considered solid, safe, and perhaps somewhat drawish. Black often chooses the Queen's Indian when White avoids the Nimzo-Indian by playing 3.Nf3 instead of 3.Nc3. Black constructs a sound position that makes no positional concessions, although sometimes it is difficult for Black to obtain good winning chances. Karpov was a leading expert in this opening.

The Modern Benoni is a risky attempt by Black to unbalance the position and gain active piece play at the cost of allowing White a pawn wedge at d5 and a central majority. Tal popularized the defense in the 1960s by winning several brilliant games with it, and Fischer occasionally adopted it, with good results, including a win in his 1972 world championship match against Boris Spassky. Often Black adopts a slightly different move order, playing 2...e6 before 3...c5 in order to avoid the sharpest lines for White.

The Benko Gambit is often played by strong players, and is very popular at lower levels. Black plays to open lines on the queenside where White will be subject to considerable pressure. If White accepts the gambit, Black's compensation is positional rather than tactical, and their initiative can last even after many piece exchanges and well into the endgame. White often chooses instead either to decline the gambit pawn or return it.

The Catalan Opening is characterized by White forming a pawn center at d4 and c4 and fianchettoing their king's bishop. It resembles a combination of the Queen's Gambit and Réti Opening. Since the Catalan can be reached from many different move orders, (one Queen's Gambit Declined-like move sequence is 1.d4 d5 2.c4 e6 3.Nf3 Nf6 4.g3), it is sometimes called the Catalan System.

The most important Indian Defenses are listed below, but many others have been studied and played; see Indian Defense for details.
 1.d4 Nf6 2.c4 c5 3.d5 e6 Modern Benoni
 1.d4 Nf6 2.c4 c5 3.d5 b5 Benko Gambit (or Volga Gambit)
 1.d4 Nf6 2.c4 e6 3.Nc3 Bb4 Nimzo-Indian Defense
 1.d4 Nf6 2.c4 e6 3.Nf3 b6 Queen's Indian Defense
 1.d4 Nf6 2.c4 e6 3.g3 Catalan Opening
 1.d4 Nf6 2.c4 g6 3.Nc3 d5 Grünfeld Defense
 1.d4 Nf6 2.c4 g6 3.Nc3 Bg7 King's Indian Defense (KID)

Other Black responses to 1.d4

Of the defenses to 1.d4 other than 1...d5 and 1...Nf6, the most important are the Dutch Defense and the Benoni Defense.
The Dutch, an aggressive defense adopted for a time by World Champions Alekhine and Botvinnik, and played by both Botvinnik and challenger David Bronstein in their 1951 world championship match, is still played occasionally at the top level by Short and others. Another fairly common opening is the Benoni Defense, which may become very wild if it develops into the Modern Benoni, though other variations are more solid.

Several other uncommon semi-closed openings have been named and studied, see Semi-Closed Game for details.
 1.d4 c5 Benoni Defense
 1.d4 f5 Dutch Defense

Flank openings (including English, Réti, Bird's, and White fianchettos)

The flank openings are the group of White openings typified by play on one or both flanks.
White plays in hypermodern style, attacking the center from the flanks with pieces rather than occupying it with pawns. These openings are played often, and 1.Nf3 and 1.c4 trail only 1.e4 and 1.d4 in popularity as opening moves.

If White opens with 1.Nf3, the game often becomes one of the d4 openings (closed games or semi-closed games) by a different move order (this is called transposition), but unique openings such as the Réti and King's Indian Attack are also common. The Réti itself is characterized by White playing 1.Nf3, fianchettoing one or both bishops, and not playing an early d4 (which would generally transpose into one of the 1.d4 openings).

The King's Indian Attack (KIA) is a system of development that White may use in reply to almost any Black opening moves.
The characteristic KIA setup is 1.Nf3, 2.g3, 3.Bg2, 4.0-0, 5.d3, 6.Nbd2, and 7.e4, although these moves may be played in many different orders. In fact, the KIA is probably most often reached after 1.e4 when White uses it to respond to a Black attempt to play one of the semi-open games such as the Caro–Kann, French, or Sicilian, or even the open games which usually come after 1.e4 e5. Its greatest appeal may be that by adopting a set pattern of development, White can avoid the large amount of opening study required to prepare to meet the many different possible Black replies to 1.e4.

The English Opening (1.c4) also frequently transposes into a d4 opening, but it can take on independent character as well including the Symmetrical Variation (1.c4 c5) and the Reversed Sicilian (1.c4 e5).

Larsen's Opening (1.b3) and the Sokolsky Opening (1.b4) are occasionally seen in grandmaster play. Benko used 1.g3 to defeat both Fischer and Tal in the 1962 Candidates Tournament in Curaçao.

With Bird's Opening (1.f4) White tries to get a strong grip on the e5-square.
The opening can resemble a Dutch Defense in reverse after 1.f4 d5, or Black may try to disrupt White by playing 1...e5!? (From's Gambit).
 1.b3 Larsen's Opening
 1.b4 Sokolsky Opening
 1.c4 English Opening
 1.Nf3 Zukertort Opening (characteristically followed by fianchettoing one or both bishops, and without an early d4)
 1.Nf3, 2.g3, 3.Bg2, 4.0-0, 5.d3, 6.Nbd2, 7.e4 King's Indian Attack (KIA) (moves may be played in many different orders)
 1.f4 Bird's Opening
 1.g3 Benko Opening
 1.g4 Grob's Attack

Unusual first moves for White

First moves other than the king pawn (1.e4), queen pawn (1.d4), or flank openings (1.b3, 1.b4, 1.c4, 1.Nf3, 1.f4, or 1.g3) are not regarded as effective ways to exploit White's first-move advantage and thus are rarely played. Although some of these openings are not actually bad for White, each of the twelve remaining possible first moves suffers one or more of the following defects compared to the more popular choices:
 too passive for White (1.d3, 1.e3, 1.c3, or 1.Nc3)
 gratuitously weakens White's position (1.f3 or 1.g4)
 does little to aid White's development or control the center (1.a3, 1.a4, 1.h3, or 1.h4)
 develops a knight to an inferior square (1.Na3 or 1.Nh3)

See also

 Outline of chess: Chess openings
 Chess opening book
 List of chess openings
 List of chess openings named after people
 List of chess openings named after places
 List of chess gambits
 Encyclopaedia of Chess Openings
 Chess opening theory table
 Middlegame
 Endgame

References

Further reading

 
 
Nick de Firmian is a three-time U.S. Chess Champion. Often called "MCO-15" or simply "MCO", this is the 15th edition of a work that has been the standard English language reference on chess openings since the first (1911) edition. This book is a valuable reference for club and tournament players.
 
Garry Kasparov is the former World Chess Champion from 1985 to 2000 and Raymond Keene is a former British chess champion. This book is often called "BCO 2" and is intended as a reference for club and tournament players. It is similar in format to MCO.
 
 
John Nunn is a former British Chess Champion and a noted chess author. This book is often called "NCO" and is a reference for club and tournament players. It is similar in format to MCO and BCO 2.
 Sahovski Informator. Encyclopaedia of Chess Openings
This is an advanced, technical work in five volumes published by Chess Informant of Belgrade. http://www.sahovski.com/ It analyzes openings used in tournament play and archived in Chess Informant since 1966. Instead of using the traditional names for the openings and descriptive text to evaluate positions, Informator has developed a unique coding system that is language independent so that it can be read by chess players around the world without requiring translation. Called the "ECO", these volumes are the most comprehensive reference for professional and serious tournament players.
 
  An elementary/introductory book.
 Stefan Djuric, Dimitri Komarov, & Claudio Pantaleoni, Chess Opening Essentials (4 volumes)
 
 van der Sterren, Paul, Fundamental Chess Openings, Gambit, 2009, 
 
  (Three chapters of general opening principles; open and semi-open games)
  (Closed games and Indian defenses)
  (English Opening)
 
 Chess Openings by Edward Winter

 
Chess theory
Chess terminology
Game theory